This page lists the municipal flags of Chūbu region, Japan. It is a part of the List of Japanese municipal flags, which is split into regions due to its size.

Complete lists of Japanese municipal flags pages

 List of municipal flags of Hokkaidō
 List of municipal flags of Tōhoku region
 List of municipal flags of Kantō region
 List of municipal flags of Chūbu region
 List of municipal flags of Kansai region
 List of municipal flags of Chūgoku region
 List of municipal flags of Shikoku
 List of municipal flags of Kyūshū

Niigata Prefecture

Cities

Towns and villages

Historical

Toyama Prefecture

Cities

Towns and villages

Historical

Ishikawa Prefecture

Cities

Towns

Historical

Fukui Prefecture

Cities

Towns and villages

Historical

Yamanashi Prefecture

Cities

Towns and villages

Historical

Nagano Prefecture

Cities

Towns and villages

Historical

Gifu Prefecture

Cities

Towns and villages

Historical

Shizuoka Prefecture

Cities

Towns and villages

Historical

Aichi Prefecture

Cities

Wards

Towns and villages

Historical

Municipal